Manke may refer to:

 Rolf Manke (1915–1944), commander of German submarine U-358.
 Manke Nelis (born 1919), Dutch singer in the levenslied genre.
 Mount Manke, a mountain in the Harold Byrd Mountains.